The Mad Woman in the Attic is the second serial of the third series of the British science fiction television series The Sarah Jane Adventures. The two-part story was first broadcast on BBC One on 22 and 23 October 2009, and marks the return of John Leeson as K9.

Plot
After overreacting to what she believed was her friends not giving her enough attention, Rani meets with her old friend Sam in her old beachside town. Sam had emailed Rani that people had been disappearing and a demon had been sighted in the pleasure park. At the park, Rani meets Eve, a telepathic alien girl with red skin whose parents sent her to Earth to avoid a war on her home planet. She explains to Rani that she has brought lonely people to the park so they could have fun. Reacting to Eve's perception that she's been feeling left out, Rani denies that she needs Sarah Jane, Luke, and Clyde and wishes "that they would just leave me alone." Offering to show Rani her future, Eve brings her to a mirror where she sees herself as a lonely old woman.

Rani takes Eve outside, but is taken control of by Eve when she is horrified by Eve controlling the missing people. After Sarah Jane and Clyde discover Rani's whereabouts, Ship, the artificial intelligence of Eve's crashed spaceship, explains to Sarah Jane and Clyde that Harry, the caretaker, was keeping Eve safe while Ship rebooted itself. As Eve is still young, she will die from being unable to control her powers. Sarah Jane, Clyde, and Harry then take Eve back to the beach where Ship crashed. Ship removes Eve's excess energy that was causing her pain, which releases all those Eve was controlling. As Ship uses black holes as fuel, it absorbs the energy from the black hole K9 was protecting from destroying Earth. This also allows K9 to return home permanently. Sam and Harry are invited to leave Earth with Eve. As Sarah Jane and her friends are about to leave, Ship grants Rani's wish that Sarah Jane, Luke, and Clyde would leave her alone and causes the three of them to disappear. Due to a malfunction caused by the crash, Ship did not understand that Rani's wish was not intended literally, and Rani spends years alone in the attic of Sarah Jane's house.

In 2059, Adam, the son of Sam and Eve, meets Rani and upon hearing her story, gives her the opportunity to change her past. Rani's timeline is altered so that Ship does not fulfil her old wish. In the changed timeline, an older Rani is living happily with her son and grandchildren in Sarah Jane's house.

Continuity
When Ship looks into Sarah Jane's past, clips of her childhood from first and second-season episodes, The Temptation of Sarah Jane Smith, The Day of the Clown and Whatever Happened to Sarah Jane?; these are followed by scenes of her time with the Doctor from the Third Doctor serials The Time Warrior (her introduction) and Planet of the Spiders, and when she returned to Earth in the Fourth Doctor serial The Hand of Fear (these clips also include footage of Jon Pertwee as the Third Doctor and Tom Baker as the Fourth); she is also shown with K9 Mark III from The Five Doctors and with the Daleks in "The Stolen Earth". Scenes of the near future show the TARDIS' arrival in the Smiths' attic in the following serial, The Wedding of Sarah Jane Smith and a very brief glimpse of David Tennant as the Tenth Doctor running through its doors. This episode marks the first use of clips from the "classic era" of Doctor Who in The Sarah Jane Adventures, though still images of Sarah Jane and Brigadier Lethbridge-Stewart from the series have been seen previously. It is the second time classic series clips have been used in revived "Whoniverse" programmes (silent footage having been shown in "The Next Doctor") and the first time they have been used with sound.

Notes

References

External links

The Sarah Jane Adventures episodes
2009 British television episodes
Fiction set in 2009
Fiction set in 2059
Television episodes about abduction
Television episodes set in amusement parks
Fiction about mind control
Television episodes about telepathy
Television episodes about artificial intelligence